Talwandi Aklia (also known as Chhoti Talwandi) is a small village in Mansa district of Punjab, India. It was on the list for more than 90% of voting in the February 2012 elections.

References 

Villages in Mansa district, India
Villages surrounding Talwandi Sabo Power Plant